John McGraw (22 May 1815 - 4 May 1877) was a wealthy New York State lumber merchant, philanthropist, early benefactor and trustee of Cornell University.

Early years
John McGraw was born in Dryden, NY in the year 1815 to Joseph McGraw and Jane Nelson McGraw, both natives of Northern Ireland.

Career
He and his business partner, Henry W. Sage, together made a great deal of money selling lumber from forests in New York, Wisconsin and Michigan, and operating a large lumber mill in Wenona, Michigan, now part of Bay City, Michigan.  They also co-founded the town of Wenona.

Family
He married Rhoda Charlotte Southworth in Dryden.  She was born September 19, 1819, also in Dryden, the daughter of John Southworth of Salisbury, New York and Nancy Ellis Southworth of Dryden.  She gave birth to his only daughter, Jennie McGraw. After Rhoda's death in 1847, he married her sister, Nancy Amelia Southworth in 1849. Nancy died on 29 February 1856 at the age of 30. John later married Jane P. Bates Turner in Ithaca, Tompkins, New York, in 1861. She died in Ithaca in 1904 at the age of 84.

Death
John died May 4, 1877 in Ithaca, New York.  His daughter, Jennie inherited his large fortune. She died 30 Sep 1881. Both John and his daughter, Jennie are buried in the crypt at Sage Chapel, Cornell University in Ithaca, New York.

Jennie's gift to Cornell
Upon Jennie's death, some of this fortune was bequeathed to Cornell.  A dispute over this gift led to the Great Will Case, ultimately decided by the United States Supreme Court against Cornell in Cornell Univ. v. Fiske et al. (1890).  His former business partner, Henry Sage, made a large donation to Cornell in the name of Jennie to replace the lost funds.

Legacy

The McGraw name graces the principal clock tower of Cornell. Additionally, McGraw Hall is one of the buildings on the main arts quad of Cornell University.  Among other uses, it was the first home of Cornell's business school, now known as the Samuel Curtis Johnson Graduate School of Management and located in Sage Hall.

References

Sources
 Dryden History Website
Bay City, Michigan history page
Supreme Court decision in Cornell Univ. v. Fiske et al. (1890)

1815 births
1877 deaths
American merchants
Philanthropists from New York (state)
Cornell University people
People from Dryden, New York
Businesspeople in timber
American people of Irish descent
People from Ithaca, New York
Burials at Sage Chapel
19th-century American philanthropists
19th-century American businesspeople